Malaska is a surname. Notable people with the surname include:

Mark Malaska (born 1978), American baseball player
Sanna Malaska (born 1983), Finnish footballer and coach